The San Antonio Downtown and River Walk Historic District is an amalgamation of residential and commercial sites. 197 contributing properties and 50 non-contributing properties were taken into consideration when evaluating the area for the National Register of Historic Places (NRHP) and also for the Recorded Texas Historic Landmarks  (RTHL).  The more than a century of economic growth and business/tourist development beginning in the mid-19th century is reflected in the city's architecture.

The commercial buildings showcase a wide variety of architectural styles and movements.  Among the prominent architects who were involved in designing this area of San Antonio were Atlee Ayres, Alfred Giles, James Riely Gordon, Robert H.H. Hugman, Herbert M. Greene,  Adams & Adams (Carleton W. Adams and his uncle Carl C. Adams) and Millard Sheets.

Listed below are 37 properties denoted as significant to the designation of the National Register of Historic Places listings in Bexar County, Texas. Four of the properties are also included on La Villita historic district.  The 214-acre geographical boundaries covered by this NRHP designation are the San Antonio River Walk and surrounding blocks, bounded by Cameron, Augusta, Sixth, Bonham, losoya and Tolle Place.

See also
National Register of Historic Places listings in Bexar County, Texas

References

Additional sourcing

Historic American Landscapes Survey in Texas
Historic districts on the National Register of Historic Places in Texas
National Register of Historic Places in Bexar County, Texas
Pedestrian malls in the United States
Restaurant districts and streets in the United States
River Walk
Transportation in Bexar County, Texas
Works Progress Administration in Texas